Vilho Ilmari Ylönen (31 May 1918 – 8 March 2000) was a Finnish cross-country skier and rifle shooter who competed in the 1948, 1952, 1956, 1960 and 1964 Winter Olympics.

Ylönen was a career military officer serving as a non-commissioned officer at the Finnish Air Force base in Tikkakoski; at the time of 1948 Winter Olympics held the rank of kersantti (sergeant). He was a member of the Finnish team that placed second in the military patrol demonstration event (precursor to biathlon). In other Olympics he competed in several rifle events and had best results in the 50 m small-bore rifle three positions and 300 m free rifle three positions. In the former event he won a silver medal in 1952 and finished fifth in 1956, while in the latter discipline he won a bronze medal in 1956 and placed fourth in 1960.

Ylönen won 14 medals at the world championships in the 1950s, including four gold medals. At the European Championships, he collected one gold, six silver and two bronze medals. Ylönen was also a three-time Nordic champion and 44 times national champion. In 1958 he was voted as Finnish Sportspersonality of the year.

After retiring from the military service, Ylönen worked as a factory representative for the Tikkakoski Arms Factory.

References

External links
 Vilho Ylönen

1918 births
2000 deaths
People from Hankasalmi
Finnish military patrol (sport) runners
Finnish male sport shooters
ISSF rifle shooters
Olympic biathletes of Finland
Olympic shooters of Finland
Military patrol competitors at the 1948 Winter Olympics
Shooters at the 1952 Summer Olympics
Shooters at the 1956 Summer Olympics
Shooters at the 1960 Summer Olympics
Shooters at the 1964 Summer Olympics
Olympic silver medalists for Finland
Olympic bronze medalists for Finland
Olympic medalists in shooting
Medalists at the 1952 Summer Olympics
Medalists at the 1956 Summer Olympics
Sportspeople from Central Finland